Amusa or AMusA may refer to:

 Amusa (river), in Italy
 Associate in Music, Australia
 Dayo Amusa, Nigerian actress and singer